The 1959 Ohio State Buckeyes football team represented the Ohio State University in the 1959 Big Ten Conference football season. The Buckeyes compiled a 3–5–1 record.

Schedule

Game summaries

Duke

USC

Illinois

Purdue

Wisconsin

Michigan State

Indiana

    

Ohio State:  127 yards total offense; 5 first downs; 8 punts for 333 yards; missed FGs from 58 and 50 yards

Indiana: 179 yards total offense; 11 first downs; 7 punts for 290 yards

Iowa

Michigan

Coaching staff
 Woody Hayes - Head Coach - 9th year

1960 pro draftees

References

Ohio State
Ohio State Buckeyes football seasons
Buckeyes